Jeremiah O'Riordan (1925 - 16 June 1987) was an Irish hurler, who played as a corner-back and as a full-forward, and is most known for his time with the Cork senior hurling team. He was the elder brother of Mossy O'Riordan.

Career

Born in Cork, O'Riordan was educated at Sullivan's Quay and the North Monastery, where he won a Harty Cup medal. He began his club hurling career with the Blackrock club, before later lining out with the Civil Service club in Dublin and ending his career with Claughaun and Ahane in Limerick. Coughlan first appeared on the inter-county scene with the Dublin senior hurling team that lost the 1945 Leinster final to Kilkenny. He transferred to the Cork senior hurling team the following season and ended his debut year with an All-Ireland Championship title. O'Riordan was a mainstay of the team for nearly a decade and was at right corner-back for Cork's three successive All-Ireland titles between 1952 and 1954. His other honours with Cork include five Munster Championship titles and a National Hurling League. O'Riordan also earned selection with the Leinster and Rest of Ireland teams and won two Railway Cup medals with Munster. He was chosen on the Cork Team of the Century in 1984.

Personal life and death

O'Riordan spent his entire working life with the Customs and Excise and was based in Bantry, Dublin and finally Limerick where he worked as a collector. He died at Limerick Regional Hospital on 16 June 1987.

Honours

Cork
All-Ireland Senior Hurling Championship: 1946, 1952, 1953, 1954
Munster Senior Hurling Championship: 1946, 1947, 1952, 1953, 1954
National Hurling League: 1952-53

Munster
Railway Cup: 1950, 1955

References

1925 births
1987 deaths
Blackrock National Hurling Club hurlers
Civil Service hurlers
Claughaun hurlers
Ahane hurlers
Dublin inter-county hurlers
Cork inter-county hurlers
Leinster inter-provincial hurlers
Munster inter-provincial hurlers
All-Ireland Senior Hurling Championship winners